Zenon Begier (23 November 1935 – 27 July 2019) was a Polish athlete. He competed in the men's discus throw at the 1960 Summer Olympics and the 1964 Summer Olympics.

References

External links
 

1935 births
2019 deaths
Athletes (track and field) at the 1960 Summer Olympics
Athletes (track and field) at the 1964 Summer Olympics
Polish male discus throwers
Olympic athletes of Poland
People from Oborniki County
Sportspeople from Greater Poland Voivodeship
Zawisza Bydgoszcz athletes